Metzneria hilarella is a moth of the family Gelechiidae. It was described by Aristide Caradja in 1920. It is found in France and Spain.

References

Moths described in 1920
Metzneria